The Scientific Center of Kuwait, located in Salmiya, Kuwait, serves as a center for environmental education in the Persian Gulf region. KSC spans over 80,000 square meters with the building covering over 18,000 square meters. The center also houses the largest aquarium in the Middle East after Dubai, holding over 100 different species of animals.  Along with the aquarium, it also contains an IMAX theatre, a harbor of historic dhows, and a gift shop among other contents.

Facilities
The Scientific Center has three main sections: Aquarium, Discovery Place, and IMAX theater.

See also 
Fateh Al-Khayr

References

External links
 Official Webpage

Museums in Kuwait
Tourist attractions in Kuwait
Buildings and structures in Kuwait City
2000 establishments in Kuwait
Museums established in 2000
Entertainment venues in Kuwait